Sirichok Sopha (born 14 June 1967), nicknamed Lek ("small"), is a Thai Democrat Party politician who represented Songkhla Province in the House of Representatives. He was educated at Assumption College, St Bede's Preparatory School, Eastbourne College, King's College London (B.Sc. in Chemistry) and Prince of Songkla University (MBA), and previously served as Private Secretary to Prime Minister Abhisit Vejjajiva. 

He is currently single, and he likes Stoke City FC.

References

1967 births
Living people
Sirichok Sopha
People educated at St. Bede's Prep School
People educated at Eastbourne College
Alumni of King's College London
Sirichok Sopha
Sirichok Sopha
Sirichok Sopha
Sirichok Sopha
Sirichok Sopha